Seshambadi is a village in the Kumbakonam taluk of Thanjavur district, Tamil Nadu, India.

Demographics 

As per the 2001 census, Seshambadi had a total population of 1827 with 940 males and 887 females. The sex ratio was 944. The literacy rate was 46.82.

References 

 

Villages in Thanjavur district